Ethnogala is an annual gala evening in Finland for performers of folk music and folk dance. It is organized by the Centre for Folk Music and Folk Dance in Finland.

Ethnogala was first arranged at the end of 2017, and the second gala was arranged in January 2019. The gala was broadcast live by Yle in the internet, and can still be seen worldwide in Yle Areena. An edited version will later be broadcast by Yle on the television.

2017 nominees and winners
Artist of the Year
Anne-Mari Kivimäki
Other nominees: Frigg, Ismaila Sané

Phenomenon of the Year
Orivesi All Stars
Other nominees: Kalevauva.fi, Pelimanni 8bit

Newcomer of the Year
Maija Kauhanen
Other nominees: BaranBand, Elssa Antikainen

Border Breaking Act of the Year
Frigg
Other nominees: Okra Playground, Pekko Käppi & K:H:H:L

 Folk Music Songwriter of the Year
Pekko Käppi & K:H:H:L
Other nominees: Anne-Mari Kivimäki, Tuuletar

Choreographer of the Year
Petri Kauppinen
Other nominees: Hanna Poikela, Rami Meling

Intersection Prize
Hilda Länsman
Other nominees: Digelius Music, World Music School Helsinki

2019 nominees and winners
Newcomer of the Year
Pauanne
Other nominees: Mammantytöt!, Solju

 Intersection Prize
Kulttuuriyhdistämö Interkult
Other nominees: Haapavesi Folk Music Festival, Helsinki-Cotonou Ensemble

Border Breaking Act of the Year
Sväng
Other nominees: Antti Paalanen, Tuuletar

Choreographer of the Year
Kaari Martin
Other nominees: Hanna Poikela, Tanssiteatteri Tsuumi

Producer of the Year
Kulttuuriosuuskunta Uulu
Other nominees: Bafe’s Factory, Rahvaanmusiikin kerho

Folk Music Songwriter of the Year
Solju
Other nominees: Heikki Laitinen, Tuuletar

Artist of the Year
Sväng
Other nominees: Helsinki-Cotonou Ensemble, Johanna Juhola

References

External links
Ethnogala 2019 in Yle Areena

Annual events in Finland
Finnish folk music
Dance in Finland
Finnish folk culture
Folk dance
Music events in Finland